"Off on Your Own (Girl)" is a 1988 single recorded by Al B. Sure! and written and produced by Al B. Sure! and Kyle West.  The single was the second release from his debut album, In Effect Mode, and peaked at number one on the Black Singles chart for  two weeks.  "Off on Your Own (Girl)" also peaked at number forty-five on the Hot 100.

Chart positions

References
 

1988 singles
1988 songs
Songs written by Al B. Sure!
Songs written by Kyle West
Al B. Sure! songs